Léran is a commune in the Ariège department in southwestern France.

Geography
The city is situated on the coast of Lac de Montbel, an artificial reservoir.

Population
Its citizens are called Léranais.

Administration
The current mayor, elected in 2001, is Henri Barrou, whose term will continue until 2020. Barrou is also a school principal.

Sights
The Chateau de Léran can be seen in the commune, which dates to 1163.

Personalities
 Claude Silve (1887–1978), a writer, was born in Léran.

See also
Communes of the Ariège department

References

Communes of Ariège (department)
Ariège communes articles needing translation from French Wikipedia